Aschendorf is a railway station located in Aschendorf, Lower Saxony, Germany. The station lies on the Emsland Railway (Rheine - Norddeich) and the train services are operated by WestfalenBahn.

Train services
The station is served by the following service(s):

Regional services  Emden - Leer - Lingen - Rheine - Münster

References

Railway stations in Lower Saxony